Stedden is a village in the borough of Winsen (Aller) in the Lower Saxon district of Celle in North Germany. It lies on the river Aller and close to the river Örtze and has a population of just over 300. In 1985 it celebrated its 750th anniversary.

Politics 
Stedden has a joint parish council with the neighbouring village of Wolthausen.

The council chair is Christian Peters (CDU).

External links 
 Stedden website

Villages in Lower Saxony
Celle (district)
Winsen an der Aller